There is no standard variety of Scottish Gaelic; although statements below are about all or most dialects, the north-western dialects (Outer Hebrides, Skye and the Northwest Highlands) are discussed more than others as they represent the majority of speakers.

Gaelic phonology is characterised by:
a phoneme inventory particularly rich in sonorant coronal phonemes (commonly nine in total)
a contrasting set of palatalised and non-palatalised consonants
strong initial word-stress and vowel reduction in unstressed syllables
The presence of preaspiration of stops in certain contexts
falling intonation in most types of sentences, including questions
lenition and extreme sandhi phenomena

Due to the geographic concentration of Gaelic speakers along the western seaboard with its numerous islands, Gaelic dialectologists tend to ascribe each island its own dialect. On the mainland, no clear dialect boundaries have been established to date but the main areas are generally assumed to be Argyllshire, Perthshire, Moidart/Ardnamurchan, Wester Ross and Sutherland.

History of the discipline
Descriptions of the language have largely focused on the phonology. Welsh naturalist Edward Lhuyd published the earliest major work on Scottish Gaelic after collecting data in the Scottish Highlands between 1699 and 1700, in particular data on Argyll Gaelic and the now obsolete dialects of north-east Inverness-shire.

Following a significant gap, the middle to the end of the twentieth century saw a great flurry of dialect studies in particular by Scandinavian scholars, again focussing largely on phonology:
1938 Nils Holmer Studies on Argyllshire Gaelic published by the University of Uppsala
1937 Carl Borgstrøm The Dialect of Barra published by Norsk Tidsskrift for Sprogvidenskap
1940 Carl Borgstrøm The Dialects of the Outer Hebrides published by Norsk Tidsskrift for Sprogvidenskap
1941 Carl Borgstrøm The Dialects of Skye and Ross-shire published by the Norwegian University Press
1956 Magne Oftedal The Gaelic of Leurbost, Isle of Lewis published by Norsk Tidsskrift for Sprogvidenskap
1957 Nils Holmer The Gaelic of Kintyre published by the Dublin Institute for Advanced Studies
1962 Nils Holmer The Gaelic of Arran published by the Dublin Institute for Advanced Studies
1966 Gordon MacGillFhinnein Gàidhlig Uibhist a Deas ("South Uist Gaelic") published by the Dublin Institute for Advanced Studies
1973 Elmar Ternes The Phonemic Analysis of Scottish Gaelic (focussing on Applecross Gaelic) published by the Helmut Buske Verlag
1978 Nancy Dorian East Sutherland Gaelic published by the Dublin Institute for Advanced Studies
1989 Máirtín Ó Murchú East Perthshire Gaelic published by the Dublin Institute for Advanced Studies

In the period between 1950 and 1963, fieldwork was carried out to document all then remaining Gaelic dialects, culminating in the publication of the five-volume Survey of the Gaelic Dialects of Scotland by the Dublin Institute for Advanced Studies in 1997. The survey collected data from informants as far south as Arran, Cowal, Brig o' Turk, east to Blairgowrie, Braemar and Grantown-on-Spey, north-east to Dunbeath and Portskerra and all areas west of these areas, including St Kilda.

Vowels
The following is a chart of the monophthong vowel phonemes appearing in Scottish Gaelic:

Phonologically,  behaves both as a front or back vowel depending on the geographical area and vowel length.

Diphthongs
The number of diphthongs in Scottish Gaelic depends to some extent on the dialect in question but most commonly, 9 or 10 are described: .

Orthography
Vowels are written as follows:

{| class="wikitable"
|+ A table of vowels with pronunciations in the IPA
! Spelling
! Pronunciation
! Scottish English [SSE] equivalents
! As in
|-
| a, á || ,  || cat ||  bata, ás
|-
| à, a ||  || father/calm ||  bàta, barr
|-
| e || ,  || get ||  le, teth
|-
| è, é || ,   || wary, late/lady || gnè, dé
|-
| i || ,  || tin, sweet ||  sin, ith
|-
| ì, i ||  || evil, machine ||  mìn, binn
|-
| o || ,   || top || poca, bog
|-
| ò, o, ó  || ,   || jaw, boat/go || pòcaid, corr, mór
|-
| u ||   || brute || Tur
|-
| ù, u ||  || brewed ||  tùr, cum
|-
|}

The English equivalents given are approximate, and refer most closely to the Scottish pronunciation of Standard English. The vowel  in English father is back  in Southern English. The  in English late in Scottish English is the pure vowel  rather than the more general diphthong .

Digraphs and trigraphs

The language uses many vowel combinations, which can be categorised into two types, depending on the status of one or more of the written vowels in the combinations.

Category 1: vowel plus glide vowels. In this category, vowels in digraphs/trigraphs that are next to a neighbouring consonant are for all intents and purposes part of the consonant, showing the broad or slender status of the consonant.

{|class="wikitable mw-collapsible mw-collapsed"

|-
! Spelling
! Pronunciation
! Preceding consonant
! Following consonant
! As in
|-
| ai || ~; (unstressed syllables) ~~ || preceded by a broad consonant or Ø || followed by a slender consonant || (stressed syllable) caileag, ainm ;(unstressed syllables) iuchair, geamair, dùthaich
|-
| ài ||  || preceded by a broad consonant or Ø || followed by a slender consonant || àite, bara-làimhe 
|-
| ea || ~~ [in part dialect variation] || preceded by a slender consonant or Ø || followed by a broad consonant || geal; deas; bean 
|-
| eà ||  || preceded by a slender consonant or Ø || followed by a broad consonant || ceàrr
|-
| èa ||  || preceded by a slender consonant or Ø || followed by a broad m, mh or p || nèamh
|-
| èa ||  || preceded by a slender consonant or Ø || followed by a broad consonant other than m, mh or p|| dèan
|-
| ei || ~ || preceded by a slender consonant or Ø || followed by a slender consonant || eile; ainmeil
|-
| èi ||  || preceded by a slender consonant or Ø || followed by a slender consonant || sèimh
|-
| éi ||  || preceded by a slender consonant or Ø || followed by a slender consonant || fhéin
|-
| eo ||  || preceded by a slender consonant or Ø || followed by a broad consonant || deoch
|-
| eò ||  || preceded by a slender consonant or Ø || followed by a broad consonant || ceòl
|-
| eòi ||  || preceded by a slender consonant or Ø || followed by a slender consonant || feòil
|-
| eu || ~ [dialect variation, broadly speaking south versus north] || preceded by a slender consonant or Ø || followed by a broad consonant || ceum; feur
|-
| io || ,  || preceded by a slender consonant or Ø || followed by a broad consonant || fios, fionn
|-
| ìo || ,  || preceded by a slender consonant or Ø || followed by a broad consonant || sgrìobh, mìos
|-
| iu ||  || preceded by a slender consonant or Ø || followed by a broad consonant || piuthar, fliuch
|-
| iù ||  || preceded by a slender consonant or Ø || followed by a broad consonant || diùlt
|-
| iùi ||  || preceded by a slender consonant or Ø || followed by a slender consonant || diùid
|-
| oi || ,  || preceded by a broad consonant or Ø || followed by a slender consonant || boireannach, goirid
|-
| òi ||  || preceded by a broad consonant or Ø || followed by a slender consonant || òinseach
|-
| ói ||  || preceded by a broad consonant or Ø || followed by a slender consonant || cóig
|-
|-
| ùi ||  || preceded by a broad consonant or Ø || followed by a slender consonant || dùin
|}
 
Category 2: 'diphthongs' and 'triphthongs'. In this category, vowels are written together to represent either a diphthong, or what was in Middle Irish a diphthong.

{| class="wikitable  mw-collapsible mw-collapsed"

|-
! Spelling
! Pronunciation
! Preceding consonant
! Following consonant
! As in
|-
| ao ||  || preceded by a broad consonant or Ø || followed by a broad consonant || caol
|-
| ia || ,  || preceded by a slender consonant or Ø || followed by a broad consonant || biadh, dian
|-
| ua ||  || preceded by a broad consonant or Ø || followed by a broad consonant || ruadh, uabhasach
|}

Category 2 digraphs can by followed by Category 1 glides, and thereby form trigraphs:

{| class="wikitable mw-collapsible mw-collapsed"

|-
! Spelling
! Pronunciation
! Preceding consonant
! Following consonant
! As in
|-
| aoi || ~ || preceded by a broad consonant or Ø || followed by a slender consonant || caoil; gaoithe
|-
| iai || ,  || preceded by a slender consonant or Ø || followed by a slender consonant || Iain
|-
| uai ||  || preceded by a broad consonant or Ø || followed by a slender consonant || ruaidh, duais
|-
|}

Consonants
Like the closely related languages, Modern Irish and Manx, Scottish Gaelic contains what are traditionally referred to as "broad" and "slender" consonants. Historically, Primitive Irish consonants preceding the front vowels  and  developed a -like coarticulation similar to the  palatalized consonants found in Russian while the consonants preceding the non-front vowels ,  and  developed a velar coarticulation. This means that consonants marked "broad" by the orthography are, for the most part simply unmarked, while "slender" consonants are palatal or palatalised. The main exception to this are the labials, which have lost their palatalised forms. The only trace of their original palatalisation is a glide found before a back vowel, e.g. beum  ('stroke') vs beò  ('alive').
Celtic linguists traditionally transcribe slender consonants with an apostrophe (or more accurately, a prime) following the consonant (e.g. m′) and leave broad consonants unmarked.

The unaspirated stops in some dialects (east and south) are voiced (see below), as in Manx and Irish. In the Gaelic of Sutherland and the MacKay Country, this is the case, while in all other areas full voicing is allophonic with regional variation, voicing occurs in certain environments, such as within breath groups and following homorganic nasals (see below). The variation suggests that the unaspirated stops at the underlying phonological level are voiced, with devoicing an allophonic variant that in some dialects has become the most common realisation. East Perthshire Gaelic reportedly lacks either a voicing or an aspiration distinction and has merged these stops. Irish dialects and Manx also have devoiced unaspirated consonants in certain environments.

{| class="wikitable" style="text-align:center;"
|+Consonants of Scottish Gaelic
! rowspan=2 colspan="2"|
! rowspan=2 |Labial
! colspan=3 |Coronal
! colspan=2 |Dorsal
! rowspan=2 |Glottal
|-class=small
!Dental
!Alveolar
!colspan=2|Palatal
!Velar
|-
!colspan="2"|Plosive
|   
|   
|
|   
|   
|   
|
|-
!colspan="2"|Fricative
|   
|
|
|
|   
|   
|
|-
!colspan="2"|Nasal
|
|
|
|
|
|
|
|-
!colspan="2"|Approximant
|
|
|
|
|
|
|
|-
!rowspan="2"|Rhotic
!Tap
|
|
| 
|
|
|
|
|-
!Trill
|
|
|
|
|
|
|
|}

In the modern languages, there is sometimes a stronger contrast from Old Gaelic in the assumed meaning of "broad" and "slender". In the modern languages, the phonetic difference between "broad" and "slender" consonants can be more complex than mere "velarisation"/"palatalisation". For instance, the Gaelic "slender s" is so palatalised that it has become postalveolar .

Certain consonants (in particular the fricatives  and the lenis coronals ) are rare in initial position except as a result of lenition.

Phonetic variation

Gaelic phonemes may have various allophones as well as dialectal or variations in pronunciation not shown in the chart above. The more common ones are:
 may also be affricated:
Area 1 without affrication 
Area 2 with strong affrication 
Area 3 with weak affrication 
 as

Velarised l

Velarised  has 6 main realisations as shown on the map:
Area 1, by far the most populous, has . The area includes most of the Outer Hebrides, the Highlands and areas south of central western areas such as Kintyre, Arran, Argyll and East Perthshire.
This feature is strongly associated with Eigg to the point it is referred to as "glug Eigeach", the Eigg gulp.
Area 3, between Mull and Lismore has vocalised it: 
Area 4, in the south of Mull and Easdale, has  or 
Area 5, Islay, has  or 
Area 6, St Kilda, had  or 

Aspiration
The fortis stops  are voiceless and aspirated; this aspiration occurs as postaspiration in initial position and, in most dialects, as preaspiration in medial position after stressed vowels. Similar to the manifestation of aspiration, the slender consonants have a palatal offglide when initial and a palatal onglide when medial or final.

Preaspiration

Preaspiration varies in strength and can manifest as glottal ( or ) or can vary depending on the place of articulation of the preaspirated consonant; being  before "slender" segments and  before "broad" ones. Preaspiration manifests itself as follows:
Area 4 as 
Area 6 no preaspiration

Lack of preaspiration coincides with full voicing of the unaspirated stops. Area 6 dialects in effect largely retain the Middle Irish stops, as has Manx and Irish.

Nasalisation
This is similar to eclipsis in Classical Gaelic and Irish, but not identical as it only occurs when a nasal is phonetically present whereas eclipsis in Classical Gaelic and Irish may occur in positions following a historic (but no longer present) nasal.

In southern Hebridean dialects, the nasal optionally drops out entirely before a consonant, including plosives.

Lenition and spelling
The lenited consonants have special pronunciations.
{| class="wikitable"
|+ Lenition changes
! colspan="3" | Radical
! colspan="3" | Lenited
|-
! Broad
! Slender
! colspan=2|Orthography
! Broad
! Slender
|-align=center
|   ||  || b || bh ||  ||  
|-align=center
|   ||  ||c || ch ||  || 
|-align=center
|  ||  || d || dh ||  || 
|-align=center
|   ||  ||f || fh ||colspan=2| silent 
|-align=center
|   ||  ||g || gh ||  || 
|-align=center
|  ||  ||colspan=2| l ||  ||
|-align=center
|  ||  ||m ||  mh ||  || 
|-align=center
|   ||  ||colspan=2| n ||  || 
|-align=center
|   ||  ||p|| ph ||  || 
|-align=center
| colspan=2|  ||colspan=2| r || colspan=2|  
|-align=center
|   ||  || s || sh ||  || 
|-align=center
|  ||  ||t||  th ||  || 
|-
|}

The  is not lenited when it appears before . Lenition may be blocked when homorganic consonants (i.e. those made at the same place of articulation) clash with grammatical lenition rules. Some of these rules are active (particularly with dentals), others have become fossilised (i.e. velars and labials). For example, blocked lenition in the surname Caimbeul ('Campbell') (vs Camshron 'Cameron') is an incident of fossilised blocked lenition; blocked lenition in air an taigh salach "on the dirty house" (vs air a' bhalach mhath 'on the good boy') is an example of the productive lenition blocking rule.

Stress
Stress is usually on the first syllable: for example drochaid ('a bridge') . Words where stress falls on another syllable are generally indicated by hyphens: these include certain adverbs such as an-diugh ('today')  and an-còmhnaidh ('always') . In loanwords, a long vowel outside the first syllable is also indicative of stress shift, for example buntàta ('potato') .

Epenthesis

A distinctive characteristic of Gaelic pronunciation (also present in Scots and Scottish English dialects (cf. girl  and film ) is the insertion of epenthetic vowels between certain adjacent consonants. This affects orthographic l n r when followed by orthographic b bh ch g gh m mh; and orthographic m followed by l r s ch.
tarbh ('bull') — 
Alba ('Scotland') — .

Occasionally, there are irregular occurrences of the epenthetic vowel, for example in Glaschu  ('Glasgow').

There are often wide variations in vowel quality in epenthetic vowels, as illustrated by a map showing the pronunciations of "dearbh."
Area 1 
Area 2  with the  appearing in the northwestern region but not the southeastern
Area 3 
Area 4  with vocalization of the 
Area 5  with reduction of the epenthetic vowel as in Irish

Elision
Schwa  at the end of a word is dropped when followed by a word beginning with a vowel. For example:
duine ('a man') — 
an duine agad ('your man') —

Tones
Of all the Celtic languages, lexical tones only exist in the dialects of Lewis and Sutherland in the extreme north of the Gaelic-speaking area. Phonetically and historically, these resemble the tones of Norway, Sweden and western Denmark; these languages have tonal contours typical for monosyllabic words and those for disyllabic words.  In Lewis Gaelic, it is difficult to find minimal pairs. Among the rare examples are: bodh(a)  ('underwater rock') vs. bò  ('cow'), and fitheach  ('raven') vs. fiach  ('debt'). Another example is the tonal difference between ainm  and anam , the latter of which has the tonal contour appropriate to a disyllable. These tonal differences are not to be found in Ireland or elsewhere in the Scottish Gàidhealtachd. Furthermore, they are disappearing entirely among younger speakers even in Lewis.

Morphophonology

Morphophonological variation
The regular verbal noun suffix, written <(e)adh>, has several pronunciations.
Area 1:  (as expected from the spelling)
Area 2: 
Area 3: 
Area 4: no suffix
Area 5: 
Area 6 is characterized by a high level of variation both between words and adjacent informants

For some words it is possible to resolve the indeterminate area, for example with the verb sgrìobadh ("scraping"):
Area 1:  (as expected from the spelling)
Area 2: 
Area 3: 
Area 4: no suffix
Area 5: 
Area 6:

Notes

References

Further reading

External links
A detailed pronunciation guide on Akerbeltz (IPA)
Multimedia maps of dialectal differences in phonology based on the Scottish Gaelic Dialect Survey.

See also

Phonology
Celtic phonologies
Orthography